Narcotic, refers to medical or psychoactive compound with sleep-inducing properties. In the United States it has since become associated with opiates and opioids, commonly morphine and heroin, as well derivatives of many of the compounds found within raw opium latex.

Narcotic or Narcotics may also refer to:

 Narcotic, album by Muslimgauze
 "Narcotic", song by Liquido
 "Narcotic" (Younotus, Janieck and Senex song), 2019 song, that remixes Liquido’s song
 Narcotics (film), 1932 German drama film directed by Kurt Gerron and Roger Le Bon

See also
 Narcotics Anonymous or NA, nonprofit fellowship or society of men and women for whom drugs had become a major problem